Grady Wilson may refer to:

 Grady Wilson (Sanford and Son), fictional character
 Demond Wilson, stage name of actor Grady Wilson
 Grady B. Wilson, American evangelist
 Grady Wilson (baseball)